Hate Forest is a Ukrainian black metal band formed by Roman Saenko, the leading member of Drudkh, Dark Ages, and Blood of Kingu. Thurios joined the band in 1998 after the recording of Scythia. The music is mostly very fast, but occasionally slow, with low, distorted vocals, raw low fidelity quality production, sometimes with programmed drums(drummer is a live player during concerts), and dark ambient elements (some releases have consisted entirely of dark ambient tracks). Musical influences are mostly from Scandinavian black metal to traditional death metal, especially Bolt Thrower (they covered their song "Cenotaph"). According to the band, its lyrics are about mythology, mainly Slavic, and inspired by H. P. Lovecraft's stories and Friedrich Nietzsche's philosophy. The band never gave interviews, never released photos, and held its distance from the black metal scene. This project officially came to an end in 2016, but in 2020 released a new album.

Members

Final lineup
(Note: both the following members were the original lineup which made up Hate Forest).
 Roman Saenko (also in Drudkh, Blood of Kingu and Dark Ages) – Lead vocals, guitar, bass, keyboards, and drum programming.
 Thurios (also in Drudkh, Blood of Kingu and Astrofaes) – vocals and guitar (for live performance, 2002)

Previous members
Khaoth – drums (for live performance, 2001)
Alzeth – guitar (1998–1999, 2002; former Dark Ages)
Roman Novik – bass (for live performance, 2000 and 2001)

Discography
 Scythia (demo, 1999)
 Darkness (EP, 2000)
 The Curse (demo, 2000)
 The Most Ancient Ones (full-length, 2001)
 Blood & Fire (EP, 2001)
 Ritual (EP, 2001)
 The Gates (EP, 2001)
 Blood & Fire/Ritual (compilation, 2001)
 To Those Who Came Before Us (compilation, 2002)
 Purity (full-length, 2003)
 To Twilight Thickets (compilation, 2003)
 Battlefields (full-length, 2003)
 Resistance (EP, 2004)
 Sorrow (full-length, 2005)
 Nietzscheism (compilation, 2005)
 Temple Forest (demo, 2007, recorded in 2000; appeared as a part of To Twilight Thickets, released in 2007 as a stand-alone demo)
 Grief of the Universe/Spinning Galaxies (split EP with Legion of Doom, 2008)
 Dead But Dreaming (compilation, 2009)
 Those Once Mighty Fallen (Split with Ildjarn, 2013)
 Hour of the Centaur (full-length, 2020) 
 Celestial Wanderer (EP, 2020)
 Innermost (full-length, recorded in 2021; released in 2022)

References

External links
 Hate Forest on Myspace

Musical groups established in 1995
Musical groups disestablished in 2007
Heavy metal duos
Ukrainian black metal musical groups
Musical groups from Kharkiv